SH3 domain-binding glutamic acid-rich-like protein is a protein that in humans is encoded by the SH3BGRL gene.

References

Further reading